Pseudopostega duplicata is a moth of the family Opostegidae. It was described by Donald R. Davis and Jonas R. Stonis, 2007. It is known from Costa Rica and Tortola in the British Virgin Islands.

The length of the forewings is 2–2.8 mm. Adults have been recorded almost throughout the year in Costa Rica and in April and July in the British Virgin Islands.

Etymology
The species name is derived from the Latin duplicatus (meaning repeat, double), in reference to the characteristic dual lobes of the male gnathos.

References

Opostegidae
Moths described in 2007